Aquin Catholic Schools is a group of three private Catholic schools in Freeport, Illinois in the Roman Catholic Diocese of Rockford.

History
The school opened on September 7, 1923. In July 1924, Fr. Charles Conley was appointed pastor of St. Mary's parish and was named superintendent of the school. Enrollment increased during that year and 6 acres of property adjacent to St. Vincent's orphanage was acquired to build an independent high school.  The name was changed to Aquin High School at the start of the 1924 school year. In Sept. 2007, Thomas G. Doran, the Bishop of Rockford, renamed the three Catholic schools in Freeport to Aquin Catholic Schools, and their campuses are now referred to as the Junior-Senior High Campus, the Elementary Campus, and the PreSchool Campus.

Traditions
The school's prom is open to 11th and 12th grade (junior and senior) students. Since 1926, the high school has a special prom-date lottery system used so each student has a date during prom and so cohesion increases among the students. The nuns operating the school first created the tradition, in part to provide inclusion for the students who attended Aquin from St. Vincent's Orphanage (just across the street), and as years passed other elements became a part of the annual event.

Annually, the students themselves choose to renew this small-school tradition. In 2017 Michelle Gallagher, who served as the junior class adviser, stated "It's less of a date and more like something fun to do with your classmates."  For the prospective prom-goers, on the day of "Prom Draw", the female students gather in the gymnasium and the male students in the library. As one part of the fun tradition, the female students often wear masks, disguises or paper bags so the male students, when they see them, will not know who is who.

Each male student, wearing their normal attire, or dressed in a formal outfit or a special costume, draws the name of a female student randomly from a hat. For their part of the tradition, many of the male students perform skits, with the aim of entertaining their prospective date. After the skits are over the male students ask the females to be their prom dates. The female students give gift bags to the males, and some males also have gift bags for the females.

Athletics
The Bulldogs compete in the Northwest Upstate Illini Conference.  They participate in several IHSA sponsored athletics and activities, including; football, girls cross country, girls volleyball, boys & girls basketball, boys & girls golf, boys baseball, girls softball, and girls swimming and diving.

Teams

The following teams finished in the top four of their respective IHSA sponsored state championship tournaments:

Football:   1A State Champions (1981–82) 1A State Champions (1986–87) 1A State Champions (2005–06)
Basketball (girls):   1A State Champions (2011–12) 1A State Champions (2012–13)

External links
 School system website

Notes and references

Freeport, Illinois
Roman Catholic Diocese of Rockford
Catholic elementary schools in Illinois
Catholic secondary schools in Illinois
Schools in Stephenson County, Illinois